Horace Reid (born June 14, 1955) is an American former professional tennis player.

Raised in Atlanta, Georgia, Reid won two State AAA singles championships while a Washington High School student. He ranked 10th in the U.S. for the 14s age division and was the first African American to win a Georgia state junior title.

Reid won the American Tennis Association singles championship in 1972 and was considered a protege of former world number one Arthur Ashe, who provided him with financial support. Attending UCLA on a scholarship, he played No.4 singles and No.1 doubles for the Bruins, before dropping out his second year.

Following his time at the Bruins, Reid began competing on the professional tour and achieved a best singles world ranking of 272. He featured in doubles main draws at the US Open.

ATP Challenger finals

Doubles: 1 (0–1)

References

External links
 
 

1955 births
Living people
American male tennis players
African-American male tennis players
UCLA Bruins men's tennis players
Tennis players from Atlanta